Elizabeth Ann Mathis (née Rumann, 1958) is an American politician, non-profit executive and former broadcast journalist who has served as an Iowa State Senator since 2011. A member of the Democratic Party, she was elected to represent the 18th district in a November 2011 special election and re-elected to the redrawn 34th district in 2012. Mathis was the Democratic nominee for Iowa's 1st congressional district in 2022, losing the general election to incumbent Republican Ashley Hinson.

Mathis, who co-chairs the Administration and Regulation Appropriations Subcommittee, serves on Education, Commerce, Economic Growth, Human Resources and full Appropriations committees. She is also the legislative liaison to the Iowa Department of Public Health. Mathis is the chief community officer for a child welfare and juvenile justice agency, Four Oaks.

Early life and education
Mathis was born on a farm in rural DeWitt, Iowa, in 1958. Her mother, Mary Eleanor Rumann, was a schoolteacher and nurse who served in World War II. Her father, James Edward Rumann, was a farmer and school board member who also served in the war. Mathis received her bachelor's degree in 1980 from the University of Iowa, where she double-majored in broadcasting and film and in journalism. To put herself through college, she worked weekends as a production assistant at WMT-TV.

Career

Journalism 
After graduating from college, she joined KWWL as a reporter and anchor, doing "a little bit of everything" from their newly opened Cedar Rapids bureau. Soon after joining the station, she moved to Waterloo to become an evening co-anchor alongside Ron Steele at the age of 23. Taking a break from broadcasting, she joined the faculty of Wartburg College in Waverly, Iowa in August 1996, where she taught electronic media. In 1998 she became a news anchor, reporter and producer at KCRG-TV, where she remained for nine years. In July 2007, she retired from broadcasting to become vice president for community relations for Horizons—A Family Service Alliance, a non-profit counseling and assistance agency in Cedar Rapids. She later became chief community officer for Four Oaks.

Iowa Senate
Mathis was nominated in September 2011 by the Iowa Democratic Party to run for the state senate seat vacated by Democrat Swati Dandekar. Mathis faced Republican candidate Cindy Golding in a special election held on November 8, 2011. The election was politically significant for the state, as the Republican Party controlled the Iowa governorship and General Assembly, and the Democrats stood to lose their one-seat majority in the state Senate. Mathis won the election by 56 to 44 percent and was sworn in on November 21, 2011. She sat on the Commerce, Economic Growth, Human Resources, and Ways and Means committees.

She was challenged for re-election in November 2012 by Ryan Flood, a libertarian Super PAC director and financial services representative. She ran in the newly drawn 34th district, and largely agreed with her challenger on lowering Iowa's property taxes and opposing a gas tax increase. Neither candidate took a stance on a proposed casino in nearby Cedar Rapids. Mathis was elected with around 60 percent of the vote.

U.S. House campaign

In 2021, Mathis announced her intent to run for Iowa's 2nd congressional district in the 2022 election. She lost the general election to incumbent Republican Ashley Hinson.

Personal life
She is married to Mark Mathis III, who owns the advertising agency ME&V. They live outside the city of Robins, and have two children, Mark IV and Mary Fran. Mathis has also taught part-time at the University of Iowa's School of Journalism and Mass Communication, and remains a member of the Wartburg Board of Regents.

See also
KWWL (TV)
KCRG-TV

References

Further reading
Gollnick, Kimn Swenson (2007). "Liz Mathis: Former Broadcaster Braves New Horizons". Archived from the University of Iowa Journalist

External links

Liz Mathis for Congress campaign website
Senator Liz Mathis official legislative website

|-

1958 births
21st-century American politicians
21st-century American women politicians
American television news anchors
American women academics
American women television journalists
Candidates in the 2011 United States elections
Candidates in the 2022 United States House of Representatives elections
Democratic Party Iowa state senators
Living people
University of Iowa alumni
University of Iowa faculty
Wartburg College faculty
Women state legislators in Iowa